Gilbert Laird Osborne Jessop (6 September 1906 – 16 January 1990) was an English cricketer. Jessop was a right-handed batsman who bowled right-arm off break.

Jessop was educated at Weymouth College, where he represented the college cricket team from 1922 to 1924.

Jessop made his first-class debut for the Marylebone Cricket Club in 1929 against Wales. This was Jessop's only first-class match that was not for Hampshire.

In 1933 Jessop joined Hampshire, making his debut against the touring West Indians. Jessop played a further two first-class matches for Hampshire, with his final match for the county coming against Middlesex in the same season.

In 1936 Jessop joined Cambridgeshire where he played three Minor Counties Championship fixtures against Norfolk, Lincolnshire and Suffolk.

In 1939 he joined Dorset, making his debut for the club in the 1939 Minor Counties Championship against Wiltshire. Jessop played 22 Minor Counties matches for the county, with his final match coming against Berkshire in 1952.

Died on 16 January 1990 at St Thomas Hospital, London.

Family
Jessop's father Gilbert Jessop, Sr. played Test cricket for England, as well as first-class cricket for Gloucestershire, Cambridge University and London County. His uncle Osman Jessop also played first-class cricket for Gloucestershire.

External links
Gilbert Jessop at Cricinfo
Gilbert Jessop at CricketArchive

1906 births
1990 deaths
Sportspeople from Kensington
Cricketers from Greater London
English cricketers
Hampshire cricketers
Marylebone Cricket Club cricketers
Cambridgeshire cricketers
Dorset cricketers